Lily Woodham (born 3 September 2000) is a Welsh professional footballer who plays as a left-back for Reading of the FA Women's Super League. Woodham has previously played for Bristol City and has had a loan spell at Charlton Athletic.

Career

Club
On 31 July 2019, Woodham and Charlie Estcourt joined Charlton Athletic on loan for the season.

On 7 July 2022, Reading confirmed that Woodham had signed a new two-year contract with the club.

Career statistics

Club

International goals

References   

Living people
2000 births
Welsh women's footballers
Charlton Athletic W.F.C. players
Reading F.C. Women players
Bristol City W.F.C. players
Women's association football defenders